Eddie Makhosonke Zondi (9 October 1967 - 16 June 2014) was a South African radio personality and music composer. Eddie was known for his Sunday afternoon show The Romantic Repertoire on Metro FM as well as his well-received Sunday Soul sessions. He released two well-received compilations albums in his career.

Radio career 
Zondi's broadcast career began in the early 1990s on BOP TV. His first taste for radio developed at a shopping mall’s radio kiosk, where he was the host. He first joined Radio Metro (now known as Metro FM) as a weekend sports anchor and got his first professional break in 1996.

Music compilation 
Eddie was known to his listeners as the best romantic ballads compiler. His show The Romantic Repertoire' on Metro FM attracted thousands of listeners every Sunday afternoon. When the show ended on Sunday evening, he often took the soul session party to a physical venue where he would continue playing his Sunday Soul sessions.

Personal life 
Eddie grew up in Soweto, South Africa and was married to Phakamile Zondi. Zondi is survived by daughters Siphesihle Zondi and Zethembe Zondi. He began his radio career in 1996 and worked as a radio personality until the time of his death.

Awards and nominations 
 Metro FM Awards: 2015, Special Recognition Award

Discography

Compilation albums

References

External links 
 Eddie Zondi on Twitter
Remembering Metro FM’s Eddie Zondi five years later
IN PICTURES: Eddie Zondi's final farewell

Soweto
1967 births
2014 deaths